This is a list of compositions by Kalevi Aho.

Operas 
 The Key (1978–79), libretto by Kalevi Aho and Juha Mannerkorpi based on the latter's monologue Avain
 Insect Life (original Finnish title: Hyönteiselämää) (1985–87), opera in 2 acts, libretto by the composer based on the play Ze života hmyzu by Josef Čapek and Karel Čapek
 Avant que nous soyons tous noyés (Before We Are All Drowned) (Finnish: Ennen kuin me kaikki olemme hukkuneet (1995/1999), libretto by Kalevi Aho based on radio play of the same title by Juha Mannerkorpi
 The Book of Secrets (Finnish: Salaisuuksien kirja (1998), opera in one act. Libretto by Paavo Rintala and Kalevi Aho
 Frida y Diego (2012–13), opera in 4 acts,  Spanish libretto by Maritza Núñez

Symphonies 
 Symphony No. 1 (1969)
 Symphony No. 2 (1970/1995)
 Symphony No. 3, for violin and orchestra (1971–73)
 Symphony No. 4 (1972–73)
 Symphony No. 5 (1975–76)
 Symphony No. 6 (1979–80)
 Symphony No. 7 Insect Symphony (1988)
 Symphony No. 8, for organ and orchestra (1993)
 Symphony No. 9, for trombone and orchestra (1993–94)
 Symphony No. 10 (1996)
 Symphony No. 11, for six percussionists and orchestra (1997–98)
 Symphony No. 12 Luosto, for two orchestras (2002–03)
 Symphony No. 13 Symphonic Characterizations (2003)
 Symphony No. 14 Rituals, for chamber orchestra, darabuka, djembe, gongs and tam-tams (2007)
 Symphony No. 15 (2009–10)
 Symphony No. 16, for mezzo soprano, large string orchestra and percussion (2013–14)
 Symphony No. 17 Sinfonisia freskoja (Symphonic Frescoes) (2017)
 Chamber Symphony No. 1, for 20 strings (1976)
 Chamber Symphony No. 2, for 20 strings (1991–92)
 Chamber Symphony No. 3, for alto saxophone and 20 strings (1995–96)

Orchestral 
 Silence (1982)
 Paloheimo Fanfare (1989)
 Pergamon for 4 reciters, 4 orchestral groups and organ (1990)
 The Rejoicing of the Deep Waters (1995)
 Tristia. Fantasy for wind orchestra (1999)
 Symphonic Dances (Hommage a Uuno Klami) (2001)
 Nyt ylös sieluni. Choral ouverture for orchestra (2001)
 Päiwä nyt ehtii ehtoollen. Choral ouverture for orchestra (2002)
 Louhi (2003)
 Lamu. Music in the space for young brass players (2008)
 Minea. Concertante Music for Orchestra (2008)
 Gejia. Chinese Images for Orchestra (2012)
 Maailman kaunein sointu / The most beautiful chord in the world, for youth orchestra (2016)
 Kirje tuolle puolen / Letter to the Beyond, for strings (2018)
 Pictured Within: Birthday Variations for M. C. B. (together with Sally Beamish, Sir Harrison Birtwistle, Richard Blackford, Gavin Bryars,  Brett Dean, Dai Fujikura, Wim Henderickx, Colin Matthews, Anthony Payne, John Pickard, David Sawer, Iris ter Schiphorst, Judith Weir)

Concertante

Piano 
 Piano Concerto No. 1 (1988–89)
 Piano Concerto No. 2 (for Piano & Strings) (2001–02)

Strings 
 Violin Concerto No. 1 (1981)
 Cello Concerto No. 1 (1983–84)
 Double Bass Concerto (2005)
 Viola Concerto (for Viola & Chamber Orchestra) (2006)
 Cello Concerto No. 2 (2013)
 Violin Concerto No. 2 (2015)

Woodwinds 
 Flute Concerto (2002)
 Bassoon Concerto (2004)
 Contrabassoon Concerto (2004–05)
 Clarinet Concerto (2005)
 Oboe Concerto (2007)
 Soprano Saxophone Concerto (for Soprano Saxophone & Chamber Orchestra) (2014–15)
 Tenor Saxophone Concerto (2015)
 Bass Clarinet Concerto (2018)
 Recorder Concerto (2020)
 Alto Flute Concerto (the 4th movement out of 6 is scored for Bass flute) (2021)
 Simplicius Simplicissimus. Concerto for Piccolo Clarinet & Orchestra (2021)

Brass 
 Tuba Concerto (2000–01)
 Trombone Concerto (2010)
 Trumpet Concerto (for Trumpet & Wind Orchestra) (2011)
 Horn Concerto (for Horn & Chamber Orchestra) (2011)
 Concerto for Baritone horn and Orchestra (2022)

Other 
 Sieidi. Concerto for Percussion & Orchestra (2010)
 Eight Seasons. Concerto for Theremin & Chamber orchestra (2011)
 Timpani Concerto (2015)
 Accordion Concerto (for Accordion, 19 strings & bassoon) (2015–16)
Mearra. Chamber concerto for harp & 13 strings (2016)
 Concerto for guitar and chamber orchestra (2018)
 Sonata Concertante for Accordion and Strings (1984/2019)

Multiple instruments 
 Double Concerto for Two Cellos & Orchestra (2003)
 Bells. Concerto for Saxophone Quartet & Orchestra (2008)
 Double Concerto for Cor Anglais, Harp & Orchestra (2014)
 Double Concerto for Two Bassoons & Orchestra (2016)
 Triple Concerto for Violin, Cello, Piano & Chamber orchestra (2018)
 Double Concerto for Viola and Percussion (2020)
 Double Concerto for Flute and Harp (2020)
 Double Concerto for Violin and Cello (2022)

Chamber/instrumental

String Quartets 

String Quartet No. 1 (1967)
String Quartet No. 2 (1970)
 String Quartet No. 3 (1971)
 Kimasen lento (Kimanen's Flight) for String Quartet (1998)
 String Quartet No. 4 (2021)
 String Quartet No. 5 (2021)

Quintets 

 Quintet for Oboe and String Quartet (1973)
 Quintet for Bassoon and String Quartet (1977)
 Quintet for Flute, Oboe, and String Trio (1977)
 Quintet for Alto Saxophone, Bassoon, Viola, Cello, and Double-Bass (1994)
 Quintet for Clarinet and String Quartet (1998)
 Quintet for Flute, Violin, Two Violas, and Cello (2000)
 Wind Quintet No. 1 (2006)
 String Quintet Hommage à Schubert (2009)
 Quintet for Oboe, Clarinet, Bassoon, Horn and Piano (2013)
 Wind Quintet No. 2 (2014)
 Quintet for Horn and String Quartet (2019)
 Mysterium [Piano Quintet] for Piano Left Hand and String quartet (2019)
 Berliner Bagatelle, for wind quintet (2018)

Piano 

 19 Preludes for Piano (1965–68)
 Three Small Piano Pieces (1971)
 Piano Sonata No. 1 (1980)
 Two Easy Pieces for Children (1983)
 Sonatina (1993)
 Piano Sonata No. 2 Hommage à Beethoven (2016)
 Seijaku no Uzu (The Whirl of Silence) for Piano left-hand (2021)

Sonatas for other instruments 

 Sonata for Violin Solo (1973)
 Oboe Sonata (1985)
 Sonata No. 1 for Accordion (1989)
 Sonata for Two Accordions (1989)
 Sonata No. 2 Black Birds for Accordion (1990)
 Sonata for Guitar (2019)
 Sonata for Cello and Piano (2019)

Organ  

Häämarssi I (Wedding March I) for organ (1973)
 Häämarssi II (Wedding March II) for organ (1976)
 Ludus Solemnis for Organ (1978)
 In Memoriam for Organ (1980)
 Three Interludes for Organ (1993)
 Hääsoitto (Wedding Music) for organ (1999)
 Alles Vergängliche. Symphony for organ (2007)
 Herr Gott, erhalt uns für und für (Chorale Prelude for Organ; 2017)

Other 

 Solo, for various instruments
 Solo I for Violin (1975)
 Solo II for Piano (1985)
 Solo III for Flute (1990–91)
 Solo IV for Cello (1997)
 Solo V for Bassoon (1999)
 Solo VI for Double-Bass (1999)
 Solo VII for Trumpet (2000)
 Solo VIII for Baritone Horn (2003)
 Solo IX for Oboe (2010)
 Solo X for Horn (2010)
 Solo XI (Hommage à Munir Bashir) for guitar (2013)
 Solo XII (In memoriam EJR) (Einojuhani Rautavaara) for Viola (2016)
 Solo XIII for Trombone (2017)
 Solo XIV for Clarinet (2018)
 Solo XV for Marimba (2018)
 Solo XVI (Ballade) for Harp (2019)
 Solo XVII for Clavichord (2022)

 Quartet for Flute, Saxophone, Guitar, and Percussion (1982)
 Seven Inventions and Postlude for oboe and cello (1986–1998)
 Epilogue for Trombone and Organ (1998)
 Ballad for Flute, Cello, Bassoon and Piano (1999)
 Three Tangos for Violin, Accordion, Guitar, Piano and Double-Bass (1999)
 Trio for Clarinet, Viola, and Piano (2006)
 HAHE for 4 cellos (2008)
 In memoriam Pehr Henrik Nordgren for Violin Solo (2009)
 Quasi una fantasia for Horn and Organ (2011)
 ARS for 4 cellos (2012)
 EAREGBERG for 4 cellos (2013)
 ERA for 4 cellos (2013)
 Viisi myyttistä kuvaa (Five Mythological Images) for Oboe solo (2015)
 ER-OS for Violin and Clarinet (2015)
 Two Chorale Preludes for Organ (2015)
 1. Päiwä nyt ehtii ehtoollen
 2. Nyt ylös sieluni
 Partita for Cello and Guitar (2016)
 Elegy for Contraforte and Piano (2016)
 La Violina for 4 Violins (2017)
 Lied for oboe and piano (2017)
 Quartet for Accordion and String Trio (2019)
 Sonata concertante for Accordion and String Quintet (2 violins, viola, cello, double bass; arrangement of Sonata No. 1 for accordion; 2019)
 Venematka (Barcarole) for Cello and Piano (2019)
 Am Horizont for Viola (2020)

Vocal 
 Lasimaalaus [Stained Glass) for female choir (1974); text Aila Meriluoto
 Kolme laulua elämästä (Three Songs of Life) for tenor and piano (1977); text Raimo Lehmonen
 Kyynikon paratiisi (The Paradise of the Cynic), cabaret song for tenor and 10 instrumentalists (or for tenor and piano) (1991); text Esko-Pekka Tiitinen
 Veet välkkyy taas for male choir (1992); text Viljo Kojo
 Mysteerio for female choir (1994); text Maritza Nuñez
 Ilo ja epäsymmetria (Joy and Asymmetry), Suite for mixed choir (1996); text Mirkka Rekola
 Kiinalaisia lauluja (Chinese Songs) for Soprano and Orchestra (1997); text by ancient Chinese poets, Finnish translation Pertti Nieminen
 Kolme Bertrandin monologia (Three Monologues of Bertrand) for Baritone and Orchestra (1998); text Paavo Rintala and Kalevi Aho
 Kysymysten kirja (Book of Questions) for Mezzo-soprano and Chamber Orchestra (2006); text Pablo Neruda, Finnish translation Katja Kallio
 Kolme Mawlana Rumin runoa (Three Poems of Mawlana Rumi) for mixed choir (2010); text Mawlana Rumi, Finnish translation Jaakko Hämeen-Anttila
 Sateen aikaan (Rain Time); Five Songs for Mezzo-soprano and String Quartet on Poems by Tuomas Anhava (2017)
 Hauki ja naakka (The Pike and the Jackdaw); two songs for baritone and harp (or piano) (2020). 1. Hauen laulu [The Song of the Pike], text Aaro Hellaakoski; 2. Keltainen naakka [The Yellow Jackdaw], text P. Mustapää

Arrangements 
 Songs and Dances of Death (Modest Musorgsky); instrumentation of the song cycle for bass and orchestra (1984)
  J. S. Bach: Contrapunctus XI; orchestration of the work (1984)
 Lauluseppele |The Song Garland] (Leevi Madetoja); arrangement of the cantata for male choir a cappella (1987)
 Pyörteitä [Whirls], 1st Act (Uuno Klami); orchestration of the ballet act (1988)
 Erik Tulindberg: String Quartets I-VI (composed in the 1780s); completion of the quartets (1995)
 Karelia (Jean Sibelius); completion and reconstruction of the work (1997)
 Vom Himmel hoch (Michael Praetorius); instrumentation of the double choir motet for orchestra and organ (1998)
 Lakeus (Yrjö Kilpinen); instrumentation of the song cycle for baritone and orchestra (1998)
 J. S. Bach: Präludium und Fuga in C ("Con largo", BWV 545); instrumentation of the work for symphony orchestra, chamber orchestra and 10 off-stage musicians (2005)
 Jean Sibelius: Promootiokantaatti 1897 [Cantata for the University Graduation Ceremonies 1897]; reconstruction and completion of the choir parts of the cantata for mixed choir and piano (2010)
 J. S. Bach:  Contrapunctus XIV from Die Kunst der Fuge; completion of the unfinished work for organ (or for string orchestra or string quartet) (2011)
 Einojuhani Rautavaara: Sérenade pour mon amour for violin and orchestra (2016); completion of the work (2018)

References 

Aho